Joseph Fred Naumann (born June 4, 1949) is an American prelate of the Roman Catholic Church, serving as archbishop of the Archdiocese of Kansas City in Kansas since 2004.  He previously served as an auxiliary bishop of the Archdiocese of St. Louis in Missouri from 1997 to 2004.

Biography

Early life 
Joseph Naumann was born on June 4, 1949, in St. Louis, Missouri, to Fred and Louise (née Lukens) Naumann. He graduated from St. Louis Preparatory Seminary South in St. Louis in 1967 and from Cardinal Glennon College in St. Louis in 1971.  He then served as a deacon at a parish in Florissant, Missouri and completed his theological studies at Kenrick Seminary in Shrewsbury, Missouri.

Priesthood 
Naumann was ordained to the priesthood on May 24 1975 for the Archdiocese of St. Louis by Cardinal John Carberry.  After his ordination, he was assigned as an associate pastor of St. Dominic Savio Parish in Affton, Missouri.  Naumann was transferred in 1979 to become associate pastor of Our Lady of Sorrows Parish in St. Louis. 

In 1984, Naumann was placed as a part-time curate at Most Blessed Sacrament Parish in St. Louis, while working as coordinator of the anti-abortion committee for the archdiocese. Naumann was sent in 1989 to Ascension Parish in Normandy, Missouri, remaining there for the next five years.  He was named vicar general of the archdiocese in 1994.

Auxiliary Bishop of St. Louis
On July 8, 1997, Naumann was appointed auxiliary bishop of the Archdiocese of St. Louis and titular bishop of Caput Cilla by Pope John Paul II. He received his episcopal consecration on September 3, 1997, from Archbishop Justin Rigali, with Bishops Edward O'Donnell and Edward Braxton serving as co-consecrators.  As auxiliary bishop, Naumann continued in his role as vicar general.  He was named as apostolic administrator of the archdiocese in October 2003.

Archbishop of Kansas City in Kansas
John Paul II named Naumann as the coadjutor archbishop of the Archdiocese of Kansas City, Kansas, on January 7, 2004, serving under Archbishop James Keleher. When Keleher resigned as archbishop on January 15, 2005, Naumann automatically succeeded him.

Naumann sits on the committees on Pro-Life and on Communications within the United States Conference of Catholic Bishops (USCCB) as well as the Kenrick-Glennon Seminary Board of Trustees and the board of regents for Conception Seminary. He is also chair of the Kansas Catholic Conference.

On April 21, 2015, Naumann was also appointed apostolic administrator for the Diocese of Kansas City–Saint Joseph.  He served in this role until November 4, 2015 when James Johnston Jr. was installed as bishop there.

Naumann was elected chairman of the USCCB Committee on Pro-Life Activities on November 14, 2017, defeating by a narrow margin Cardinal Blase Cupich. Naumann interprets Canon 915 as directing priests to deny communion to Catholic politicians who support abortion rights and euthanasia. He stated that he tried to persuade Kathleen Sebelius, then Governor of Kansas, to change her stand on abortion rights, and after her refusal in doing so, he denied her communion. Naumann's archdiocese later spent $2.45 million in support of an ill-fated proposed amendment to the Kansas constitution to remove its protection of abortion rights, which was defeated by a 59 to 41% margin. 

After sexual abuse allegations were made against Bishop John Brungardt of the Diocese of Dodge City in February 2021, the Congregation for the Doctrine of the Faith in Rome directed Neumann to open a canonical preliminary investigation into them.  In March 2022, Neumann announced that the investigation had exonerated Brungardt.

See also

 Catholic Church hierarchy
 Catholic Church in the United States
 Historical list of the Catholic bishops of the United States
 List of Catholic bishops of the United States
 Lists of patriarchs, archbishops, and bishops

References

External links

Archdiocese of Kansas City in Kansas

Episcopal succession

 

1949 births
Living people
Clergy from St. Louis
Roman Catholic Archdiocese of St. Louis
20th-century Roman Catholic bishops in the United States
21st-century Roman Catholic archbishops in the United States
Roman Catholic archbishops of Kansas City in Kansas
American anti-abortion activists
Religious leaders from Missouri